Dušan Kekéti (born 24 March 1951) is a former Slovak football goalkeeper and current president of Spartak Trnava.

During his career he played for mostly for Trnava, and earned 7 caps for the Czechoslovakia from 1973 to 1980, participating in UEFA Euro 1980.

External links

1951 births
Living people
Slovak footballers
FC Spartak Trnava players
Czechoslovak footballers
Czechoslovakia international footballers
UEFA Euro 1980 players
Czechoslovak expatriate footballers
Expatriate footballers in Austria
Czechoslovak expatriate sportspeople in Austria
Association football goalkeepers
Footballers from Bratislava